Peter Goldblatt (born 1943) is a South African botanist, working principally in the United States.

Life 
Goldblatt was born in Johannesburg, South Africa on October 8, 1943. His undergraduate studies (B.Sc.) were undertaken at the University of Witwatersrand in Johannesberg (1965–1966), from where he went on to graduate studies at the University of Cape Town, where he received his doctorate in 1970. He held a position as lecturer in botany at Witwatersrand (1967) and then Cape Town (1968–1971) before emigrating to the United States in 1972. In the US he took up a position as a researcher at the Missouri Botanical Gardens, in St. Louis, where he has remained since, holding the position of Senior Curator since 1990. He returned briefly to South Africa in 2006 as a researcher at the Compton Herbarium, South African National Biodiversity Institute, in Cape Town. He has also held appointments at the University of Missouri, as well as the University of Portland, Oregon (2000–2004). He obtained US citizenship in 1978.

Work 
Peter Goldblatt started his career as a plant collector in 1962, and worked extensively in Cape Province, but also in other regions of Africa, Madagascar, the United States, Greece, Italy, Israel, Turkey and Iran, having collected thousands of specimens. His interests lie in systematic taxonomy. One of his main research interests has been the cytology and taxonomy of the Iridaceae of Africa.  A member of several botanical societies, he was also General Secretary (1982–1985) of the Association for the Taxonomic Study of Tropical African Flora.

In 1999 he was awarded the International Bulb Society's Herbert Medal for his contributions to the knowledge of bulbous plants. In 2021 he was awarded the Foster Memorial Plaque for his contributions to the genus Iris.

Selected publications 
Goldblatt has published a large number of scientific publications, and several books (see C.V.).
 Books
 A revision of the genera Lapeirousia Pourret and Anomatheca Ker in the winter rainfall region of South Africa (1972)
 The Moraeas of Southern Africa (Annals of Kirstenbosch Botanic Gardens) (1996)
 The Genus Watsonia: A Systematic Monograph (Annals of Kirstenbosch Botanic Gardens) (1989, 1995)
 The Woody Iridaceae: Systematics, Biology and Evolution of Nivenia, Klattia and Witsenia. Timber Press, Portland, Oregon (1993).
 Gladiolus in Tropical Africa: Systematics, Biology and Evolution (1996, 2003)
 Wildflowers of the Fairest Cape (2000)
 Cape plants: A conspectus of the Cape flora of South Africa (Strelitzia) (2000)
 The Woody Iridaceae: Nivenia, Klattia & Witsenia: Systematics, Biology & Evolution (2003)The Woody Iridaceae
 The Iris Family: Natural History and Classification (2008)
 A Revision of the Southern African Genus Babiana, Iridaceae: Crocoideae
Coauthored with John Charles Manning:
 Gladiolus in Southern Africa: Systematics, Biology, and Evolution. Fernwood Press, Cape Town. (1998)
 The Complete Color Encyclopedia of Cape Bulbs (2002)
 Crocosmia and Chasmanthe (Royal Horticultural Society Plant Collector Guide) (2004).
 

 Book chapters
  In 
 Iridaceae. In K. Kubitzki (editor), Families and Genera of Flowering Plants volume 2: 295–335. (1998).
 Articles

Legacy 
A number of taxa have been named in his honour, including;
 Gladiolus goldblattianus Geerinck 
 Villarsia goldblattiana Ornduff

The International Plant Names Index lists over 1,300 taxa named by him, particularly from the Iridaceae, Scilloideae including Hyacintheae, Asteraceae and  Polygalaceae. e.g.
 Campynemanthe neocaledonica (Rendle) Goldblatt
 Campynemanthe parva Goldblatt

References

Bibliography

External links 
 Biography at JSTOR
 Profile at eFloras

20th-century South African botanists
1943 births
Living people
Scientists from Johannesburg
University of the Witwatersrand alumni
Missouri Botanical Garden people